Juan Ramos Liwag (1906-1983) was a Filipino lawyer and politician who served as senator in the 5th and 6th Congress of the Philippines.

He was among the few Filipino officials who have served in all three branches of the government.

Early life and education
Liwag was born on June 12, 1906 in Gapan, Nueva Ecija to Diego Liwag and Isabel Ramos. He finished elementary schooling as valedictorian at the Gapan Intermediate School, high school at the University of the Philippines, again as valedictorian, and subsequently hurdled the Liberal Arts course with honors. In 1932, he completed his law course at the University of the Philippines College of Law, cum laude, and placed second in the 1932 Philippine Bar Examinations. He is a member of Upsilon Sigma Phi batch 1927.

Career
In 1945, he began his public service as prosecutor in the Department of Justice, assuming later the position of head of the office of special prosecutors. Four years later, he was appointed judge-at-large of the Court of First Instance and the following year was named district judge for Albay and Catanduanes. He was appointed Solicitor General in 1952, a position he held until 1954.

President Diosdado Macapagal made him Undersecretary of Justice in 1961 and on May 19 of that year, appointed him as Secretary. He served from May 20, 1962 to July 7, 1963. It was the time of the Stonehill scandal and as Secretary of Justice, Liwag had the huge task of prosecuting the American and his associates. He was also responsible for busting the credit scandal in the Philippine National Bank and the naturalization racket that had flourished unabated over the years.

In his own department, he secured salary increases for judges, solicitors, fiscals, prosecutors and court personnel.

As a member of the Senate, from 1963 to 1969, Liwag headed two important committees—the Committee on Revision of Laws and the Committee on Government Reorganization. He became a member of the committees on accounts, economy, investigation, justice, labor and immigration, national defense and public works and communications.

In 1970, he was elected to represent the 2nd district of Nueva Ecija at the 1971 Constitutional Convention.

Death and legacy
Senator Liwag died on November 30, 1983.

In his honor, the main public high school in his hometown, Gapan, was renamed Juan R. Liwag Memorial High School through Batas Pambansa Blg. 858 on April 27, 1984. Liwag was responsible for elevating the status of the school to a national high school.

Personal life
He was married to Consuelo Joson with whom he had four children namely Diego, Ramon, Aurelio and Rita.

References

1906 births
1983 deaths
20th-century Filipino lawyers
Filipino judges
Senators of the 5th Congress of the Philippines
Senators of the 6th Congress of the Philippines
Secretaries of Justice of the Philippines
Macapagal administration cabinet members
Solicitors General of the Philippines
Quirino administration personnel
Magsaysay administration personnel
Liberal Party (Philippines) politicians
People from Nueva Ecija
University of the Philippines Manila alumni